Paectes pygmaea, the pygmy paectes, is a moth in the family Euteliidae. The species was first described by Jacob Hübner in 1818. It is found in North America.

The MONA or Hodges number for Paectes pygmaea is 8959.

References

Further reading

External links
 

Euteliinae
Articles created by Qbugbot
Moths described in 1818